Varacosa parthenus is a species of wolf spider (Lycosidae) endemic to the Southeastern United States.

References

Lycosidae
Spiders of the United States
Articles created by Qbugbot
Spiders described in 1925